Cole Forbes (born 10 August 1999) is a New Zealand rugby union player for Glasgow Warriors in the Pro14. Forbes' primary position is wing or fullback.

Rugby Union career

Professional career

He credits ex-Glasgow Warrior Hugh Blake, who was a teammate at Bay of Plenty, for the opportunity to move to Glasgow. "[Hugh] found out I had Scottish grandparents. He set the groundwork for me and went to find out if anyone would be keen to take me on. The three-month trial came up with Glasgow and things went better than I thought. It was always on my mind to play in Scotland during my career, I just never thought the opportunity would come this early." He joined Glasgow Warriors in February 2021. He is Scottish qualified.

He started for the Warriors in their match against Leinster on 28 February 2021, becoming Glasgow Warrior No. 323.

International career

In June 2021 Forbes was called up to the Scotland squad for the Summer internationals.

References

External links
itsrugby.co.uk Profile

Living people
1999 births
New Zealand rugby union players
Glasgow Warriors players
Rugby union wings
Rugby union fullbacks
Bay of Plenty rugby union players
Rugby union players from the Auckland Region